"Please Be Kind" is a 1938 American song composed by Saul Chaplin with lyrics by Sammy Cahn. Popular recordings that year were by Mildred Bailey and the Red Norvo Orchestra; Bob Crosby & His Orchestra (vocal by Kay Weber); and by Benny Goodman & His Orchestra (vocal by Martha Tilton).

Notable recordings

Mildred Bailey - recorded February 10, 1938 for Brunswick Records (catalog No. 8088).
June Christy - Cool Christy (2002).
Ella Fitzgerald - Songs in a Mellow Mood (1954) and the MCA release Ella & Ellis (1983).
The Four Freshmen - Golden Anniversary Celebrations (2001), First Affair/Voices In Fun (2002)
Benny Goodman & His Orchestra (vocal by Martha Tilton - recorded March 9, 1938 for Victor Records (catalog No. 25814).
Peggy Lee - for her album The Man I Love (1957)
Johnny Mathis - included in his album Open Fire, Two Guitars (1959)
Carmen McRae - Book of Ballads (1958)
Django Reinhardt and the Quintet of the Hot Club of France with Stéphane Grappelli - recorded in London on September 1, 1938 for Decca Records.
Jimmy Scott - - recorded on October 3, 1956 for Savoy Records (catalog No.1507).
Frank Sinatra - Sinatra-Basie: An Historic Musical First (1962)
Jeri Southern - A Prelude to a Kiss (1958).
Rosemary Squires - a single release in 1958.
Maxine Sullivan - recorded on March 1, 1938 for Victor Records (catalog No. 25802).
Art Tatum - (1955) included in The Complete Pablo Group Masterpieces (1990)
Sarah Vaughan - Vaughan and Violins (1958)

References

Songs written by Saul Chaplin
Songs with lyrics by Sammy Cahn
1938 songs
Mildred Bailey songs
Carmen McRae songs